Emita (minor planet designation: 481 Emita) is a minor planet orbiting the Sun that was discovered by the Italian astronomer Luigi Carnera on February 12, 1902. The meaning of the asteroid's proper name remains unknown.

References

External links
 
 

Background asteroids
Emita
Emita
C-type asteroids (Tholen)
Ch-type asteroids (SMASS)
19020212